Labeobarbus platyrhinus is a species of ray-finned fish in the genus Labeobarbus which is endemic to Lake Tanganyika and its drainage basin.

References

 

platyrhinus
Taxa named by George Albert Boulenger
Fish described in 1900
Fish of Lake Tanganyika